Arghanj Khwa District is a district in Badakhshan province, Afghanistan. It was created in 2005 from part of Fayzabad District.  The district has a population of approximately 12,000 people.

See also 
 Fayzabad District

References 

Districts of Badakhshan Province